The Kumul Rebellion ("Hami Uprising") was a rebellion of Kumulik Uyghurs from 1931 to 1934 who conspired with Hui Chinese Muslim Gen. Ma Zhongying to overthrow Jin Shuren, governor of Xinjiang. The Kumul Uyghurs were loyalists of the Kumul Khanate and wanted to restore the heir to the Khanate and overthrow Jin. The Kuomintang wanted Jin removed because of his ties to the Soviet Union, so it approved of the operation while pretending to acknowledge Jin as governor. The rebellion then catapulted into large-scale fighting as Khotanlik Uyghur rebels in southern Xinjiang started a separate rebellion for independence in collusion with Kirghiz rebels. Various groups rebelled, and were not united (some even fought each other). The main part of the war was waged by Ma Zhongying against the Xinjiang government. He was supported by Chiang Kai-shek, the Premier of China, who secretly agreed to let Ma seize Xinjiang.

Background
Gov. Jin Shuren (Chin Shu-jen) came to power shortly after the assassination of Xinjiang (Sinkiang) Gov. Yang Zengxin (Yang Tseng-sin) in 1928. Jin was notoriously intolerant of Turkic peoples and openly antagonized them. Such acts of discrimination included restrictions on travel, increased taxation, seizure of property without due process and frequent executions for suspected espionage or disloyalty. Jin had Chinese Muslims in his provincial army like Ma Shaowu.

In 1930 Jin annexed the Kumul Khanate, a small semi-autonomous state lying within the borders of Xinjiang. The newly subjected Kumulliks' land was expropriated by the government and given to Chinese settlers. As a result, rebellion broke out on February 20, 1931, and many Chinese were massacred by the local population. The uprising threatened to spread throughout the entire province. Yulbars Khan, advisor at the Kumul court, appealed for help to Ma Zhongying, a Muslim warlord in Gansu Province, to overthrow Jin and restore the Khanate.

Ma's troops marched to Kumul and laid siege to government forces there. Although he was victorious elsewhere in the area, Ma was unable to capture the city. After being wounded that October in a battle in which Jin's force included 250 White Russian troops whom he had recruited from the Ili valley (where they had settled after the Bolshevik victory in the Russian Civil War), Ma withdrew his forces to Gansu (where he was nursed by Mildred Cable and the sisters Francesca and Eva French, whom he kept captive until he had recovered). This would temporarily leave the Xinjiang Muslims to fight Jin alone.

Ma Zhongying had a secret agreement with the Kuomintang—if he won Xinjiang, he would be recognized by the Kuomintang.

Ma's forces committed atrocities against both Han and Uyghur civilians in Xinjiang during the fighting. He conscripted Han and Uyghurs into his army to use as cannon fodder, while all the officers were Hui. The Soviet Union and Sheng Shicai claimed that Ma Zhongying was being supported by the Japanese and also claimed to have captured Japanese officers serving with his army. Despite this, Ma officially proclaimed his allegiance to the Chinese government in Nanjing.

Some scholars describe a Han officer forcing a Uyghur woman to submit to marrying him as the event that triggered the rebellion.

Soviet aid to Xinjiang Provincial Government
Jin bought two biplanes from the Soviet Union in September 1931 at 40,000 Mexican silver dollars each. They were equipped with machine guns and bombs and flown by Russian pilots. He signed a secret treaty with the Soviet Union in October 1931 that quickly led to suppression of the Kumul Rebellion and the deblockading of Kumul by provincial troops on November 30, 1931. Jin Shuren received large gold credits from the Soviet government for acquiring arms and weapons from the Soviet army and opening Soviet trade agencies in eight provincial towns: Ghulja, Chuguchak, Altai, Urumqi, Karashahr, Kucha, Aksu, Kashgar, Yarkand, Khotan. The Kuomintang found out about this the following year and decided to openly back Ma Zhongying in his war against Jin Shuren.

Ma was officially appointed Commanding Officer of the New 36th Division (National Revolutionary Army) by the Kuomintang government in Nanjing. Asked to intervene against Jin on behalf of the Turkic population, Ma readily agreed.

Separate Uyghur uprising

A separate Uyghur uprising at Khotan in southern Xinjiang broke out. These Uyghurs were not like the Kumul Uyghurs, who only wanted the Kumul Khanate restored and Jin Shuren to be overthrown. They were led by Muhammad Amin Bughra and his brothers Abdullah Bughra and Nur Ahmad Jan Bughra. These rebels wanted total independence and hated both Han Chinese and Chinese Muslims. Their leader, Sabit Damulla Abdulbaki, called for the expulsion of Chinese Muslims (Tungans) in a proclamation:

The Tungans, more than Han, are the enemy of our people. Today our people are already free from the oppression of the Han, but still continue live under Tungan subjugation. We must still fear the Han, but cannot not fear the Tungans also. The reason, we must be careful to guard against the Tungans, we must intensively oppose them, cannot afford to be polite, since the Tungans have compelled us to follow this way. Yellow Han people have not the slightest thing to do with Eastern Turkestan. Black Tungans also do not have this connection. Eastern Turkestan belongs to the people of Eastern Turkestan. There is no need for foreigners to come be our fathers and mothers...From now on we do not need to use foreigner's language or their names, their customs, habits, attitudes, written languages, etc. We must also overthrow and drive foreigners from our boundaries forever. The colours yellow and black are foul...They have dirtied our Land for too long. So now it's absolutely necessary to clean out this filth. Take down the yellow and black barbarians! Live long Eastern Turkestan!

This rebellion became entangled with the Kumul rebellion, when a Chinese Muslim and Uyghur army under Ma Zhancang and Timur Beg marched on Kashgar against the Chinese Muslim Daotai Ma Shaowu and his garrison of Han Chinese troops. Ma Shaowu began to panic and started raising Kirghiz levies under Osman Ali to defend the city. The Kirghiz were not amused at how their rebellion was crushed the previous year by Ma Shaowu, and now he wanted them to defend the city. They defected en masse to the enemy. However, Ma Zhancang also entered into secret negotiations with Ma Shaowu; he and his troops soon defected to the Han Chinese garrison in the city.

During the Battle of Kashgar (1933) the city changed hands multiple times as the confused factions battled each other. The Kirghiz began to murder any Han Chinese and Chinese Muslim they could get their hands on, and fighting broke out in the streets. Timur Beg became sympathetic to the pro-independence rebels of Muhammad Amin Bughra and Sabit Damulla Abdulbaki, while Ma Zhancang proclaimed his allegiance to the Chinese Kuomintang government and notified everyone that all former Chinese officials would keep their posts.

Ma Zhancang arranged for Timur Beg to be killed and beheaded on August 9, 1933, displaying his head outside of Id Kah Mosque.

Christians and Hindus
The Bughras applied Shariah law while ejecting Khotan-based Swedish missionaries. They demanded the withdrawal of the Swedish missionaries while enacting Shariah on March 16. 1933. In the name of Islam, Uyghur leader Amir Abdullah Bughra violently assaulted the Yarkand-based Swedish missionaries and would have executed them; however, they ended up only being banished thanks to the British interceding in their favor. There were beheadings and executions of Muslims who had converted to Christianity at the hands of the Amir's followers.

Several hundred Uighur Muslims had been converted to Christianity by the Swedes. Imprisonment and execution were inflicted on Uighur Christian converts and, after refusing to give up his Christian religion, they executed the convert Uighur Habil in 1933. The East Turkestan Republic banished the Swedish missionaries and tortured and jailed Christian converts, mainly Kirghiz and Uighurs. The openly Islamic East Turkestan Republic forcibly ejected the Swedish missionaries and was openly hostile to Christianity while espousing a Muslim Turkic ideology. The East Turkestan Republic subjected former Muslim Christian converts like Joseph Johannes Khan to jail, torture and abuse after he refused to give up Christianity in favor of Islam. After the British interceded to free Khan, he was instead forced to leave his land and in November 1933 he came to Peshawar.

The Swedish Mission Society ran a printing operation. Life of East Turkestan was the state-run media of the rebels. The Bughra lead government used the Swedish Mission Press to print and distribute the media.

The killings of two Hindus at the hands of Uighurs took place in Shamba Bazaar. Plundering of the valuables of slaughtered Indian Hindus happened in Posgam on March 25 and on the previous day in Karghalik at the hands of Uighurs. Killings of Hindus took place in Khotan at the hands of the Bughra Amirs. Antagonism against both the Hindus ran high among the Muslim Turkic Uyghur rebels in Xinjiang's southern area. Muslims plundered the possessions in Karghalik of Rai Sahib Dip Chand, who was the aksakal of Britain, and his fellow Hindus on March 24, 1933, and in Keryia they slaughtered Indian Hindus. Sindh's Shikarpur district was the origin of the Hindu diaspora there. The slaughter of the Indian Hindus was called the "Karghalik Outrage". The Muslims had killed nine of them. The forced removal of the Swedes was accompanied by the slaughter of Hindus in Khotan by the Islamic Turkic rebels. The Emirs of Khotan killed the Hindus as they forced the Swedes out and declared Shariah in Khotan on March 16, 1933.

Hostility towards Hindus predated the establishment of the Islamic republic. 
Han Chinese men, Hindu men, Armenian men, Jewish men and Russian men were married by Uyghur Muslim women who could not find husbands. Uyghur merchants would harass Hindu usurers by screaming at them asking them if they ate beef or hanging cow skins on their quarters. Uyghur men also rioted and attacked Hindus for marrying Uyghur women in 1907 in Poskam and Yarkand like Ditta Ram calling for their beheading and stoning as they engaged in anti-Hindu violence.  Hindu Indian usurers engaging in a religious procession led to violence against them by Muslim Uyghurs. In 1896 two Uyghur Turkis attacked a Hindu merchant and the British consul Macartney demanded the Uyghurs be punished by flogging.

Mass Defections
Mass defections occurred on all three sides during the rebellion. Ma Zhancang and his Chinese Muslim army were originally allied to Timur Beg and his Uyghur army while marching on Kashgar. Zhancang and his army, however, defected to Muslim commander Ma Shaowu and his Han army and fought against Timur Beg and the Uyghurs. The Kyrgyz levies under Osman Ali were originally allied to Chinese Muslim commander Ma Shaowu and his Han army, but they defected to Timur Beg's Uyghurs at the same time Ma Zhancang defected to Ma Shaowu. Han Gen. Zhang Peiyuan and his Han Chinese Ili army originally fought for the provincial government under Jin Shuren against Ma Zhongying. However, Zhang Peiyuan and his Han army defected to Ma Zhongying and his Muslim army in 1933 and joined him in fighting the provincial government under Sheng Shicai and the Soviets and White Russians. Khoja Niyaz and his Kumulik Uyghur army defected from Ma Zhongying's side to the provincial government and the Soviets and received weapons from the Soviets.

Ma Zhongying returns

Ma Zhongying returned to Xinjiang in 1933 to continue the war.

Ma used Kuomintang Blue Sky with a White Sun banners in his army and Kuomintang Blue Sky with a White Sun armbands. He himself wore a Kuomintang armband and a new36th Division uniform to show that he was the legitimate representative of the Chinese government.

Due to his severe abuse and brutality, both the Turkic (Uyghurs) and Han Chinese hated the Hui officer who was in charge of Barkul—Ma Ying-piao, whom Ma Zhongying had put in place.

Kumul was easily taken, as were other towns en route to the provincial capital. Sheng Shicai's forces retreated to Urumchi. Ground was alternately gained and lost by both sides. During this time Ma's forces became notorious for their cruelty to both Turkic and Chinese inhabitants, destroying the economy and engaging in wholesale looting and burning of villages. Once seen as a liberator by the Turkic population, which had suffered greatly under Jin Shuren, many Turkic inhabitants of the region now ardently hoped for Ma's expulsion by Sheng Shicai and an end to the seesaw military campaigns by both sides. Ma also forcibly conscripted Uyghurs into his army, turning them into infantry while only Chinese Muslims were allowed to be officers. This led to outrage among the Uyghurs at Kumul. Meanwhile, the Han Chinese commander of Ili, Zhang Peiyuan, entered into secret negotiations with Ma Zhongying, and the two joined their armies together against Jin Shuren and the Russians.

Huang Mu-sung, native of Kumul and a "Pacification Commissioner" from the Kuomintang government, soon arrived in Urumchi on an ostensible peace mission. Sheng Shicai suspected him of conspiring with some of his opponents to overthrow him. He turned out to be correct, since the Kuomintang secretly ordered Ma Zhongying and Zhang Peiyuan to attack Sheng's regime in Urumchi. As a result, he executed three leaders of the provincial government, accusing them of plotting his overthrow with Huang. At the same time Sheng Shicai also forced Huang to wire Nanjing with a recommendation that he be recognized as the official Tupan of Xinjiang.

Chiang Kai-shek sent Luo Wen'gan to Xinjiang, Luo met with Ma Zhongying and Zhang Peiyuan and urged them to destroy Sheng.

Ma Zhongying and Zhang Peiyuan then began a joint attack on Sheng's Manchurian and White Russian force during the Second Battle of Urumqi (1933–34). Zhang seized the road between Tacheng and the capital. Sheng Shicai commanded Manchurian and White Russian troops commanded by Col. Pappengut.

Ma and Zhang's Han Chinese and Chinese Muslim forces were on the verge of defeating Sheng when he requested help from the Soviet Union. This led to the Soviet Invasion of Xinjiang and Ma Zhongying's retreat after the Battle of Tutung. Kamal Kaya Efendi, a former Ottoman Turkish military officer who was Ma Zhongying's chief of staff, was captured by Soviet agents in Kumul in 1934, but instead of being executed he was made Commissar for Road Construction in Xinjiang, possibly because he was a Soviet agent himself.

In January 1934 Soviet troops crossed the border and attacked rebel positions in the Ili area in the Soviet Invasion of Xinjiang. Zhang Peiyuan's forces were defeated and he committed suicide. Despite valiant resistance, Ma Zhongying's troops were forced to retreat from the Soviet military machine's aerial bombing and were pushed back from Urumchi during the Battle of Tutung. Soviet assistance resulted in a rare White Russian and Soviet temporary military alliance against Ma. Ma wiped out a Soviet armored car column at the Battle of Dawan Cheng.

Ma's retreating forces began advancing down to southern Xinjiang to destroy the First East Turkestan Republic. He sent out an advance guard under Ma Fuyuan to attack the Khotanlik Uyghurs and Kirghiz at Kashgar. At this point Chiang Kai-shek was ready to send Huang Shaohong and his expeditionary force of 15,000 troops to assist Ma Zhongying against Sheng, but when Chiang heard about the Soviet invasion he decided to withdraw to avoid an international incident if his troops directly engaged the Soviets.

Georg Vasel, a German, was told by his White Russian driver when meeting Ma Zhongying, "Must I tell him that I am a Russian? You know how the Tungans hate the Russians."

Destruction of the First East Turkestan Republic

The Khotanlik Uyghurs and Kirghiz had conspired to form an independent regime.

On February 20, 1933, the Committee for National Revolution set up a provisional Khotan government with Sabit as prime minister and Muhammad Amin Bughra as head of the armed forces. It favored the establishment of an Islamic theocracy.

Afghan King Mohammad Zahir Shah provided weapons and support to the East Turkestan Republic. Sheng Shicai and the Soviet Union accused Ma Zhongying, a Muslim and ardently anti-Soviet, of being used by the Japanese to set up a puppet regime in Xinjiang, as they had done with Manchukuo. Sheng claimed that he captured two Japanese officers on Ma's staff. However, not a single claim of Sheng's could be proven, and he did not provide any evidence for his allegations that Ma was colluding with the Japanese. Ma Zhongying publicly declared his allegiance to the Kuomintang at Nanjing. Ma himself was given permission by the Kuomintang to invade Xinjiang.

Western traveler Peter Fleming speculated that the Soviet Union was not in Xinjiang to keep out the Japanese but to create their own sphere of influence.

The Chinese Muslim forces retreating from the north linked up with Ma Zhancang's forces in Kashgar, allied themselves with the Kuomintang in Nanjing and attacked the TIRET, forcing Niyaz, Sabit Damolla and the rest of the government to flee on February 6, 1934, to Yengi Hissar, south of the city. The Hui army crushed the Uighur and Kirghiz armies of the East Turkestan Republic at the Battle of Kashgar (1934), Battle of Yarkand and Battle of Yangi Hissar.

Japanese attempt to set up a puppet state
The Japanese invited an Ottoman prince, Abdulkerim, and several anti-Atatürk Young Turk exiles from Turkey to assist them in setting up a puppet state in Xinjiang with the Ottoman Prince as Sultan. Mustafa Ali was the Turkish advisor to the Uyghurs in the First East Turkestan Republic. Muhsin Çapanoğlu was also an advisor, and they both had Pan-Turanist views. Mahmud Nedim Bey, another of their colleagues, was also an advisor to the Uyghur separatists.

The Turkish government under Mustafa Kemal Atatürk reacted angrily at this plot and the Turkish embassy in Japan denounced the Japanese plan to create a puppet state, labeling it a "Muslim Manchukuo".
TASS claimed the Uyghur Sabit Damulla invited "Turkish emigrants in India and Japan, with their anti-Kemalist organizations, to organize his military forces."

Legacy
The designated terrorist organization Turkistan Islamic Party's magazine "Islamic Turkistan" Arabic: (تركستان الإسلامية) Uyghur: (ئىسلامى تۈركىستان) Issue #12 included a photo of the founders of the First East Turkestan Republic including Sabit Damulla Abdulbaki which was titled "Men who marked history in their blood" (رجال سطروا التاريخ بدمائهم) (1933–1352) featuring the caption "Founders of an independent islamic state in the Hijri year 1352 in East Turkestan" (مؤسسوا دولة إسلامية مستقلة عام 1352هـ في تركستان الشرقية).

Major battles

Kizil massacre

Uighur and Kirghiz Turkic fighters broke their agreement not to attack a column of retreating Han Chinese and Chinese Muslim soldiers from Yarkand New City. The Turkic Muslim fighters massacred 800 Chinese Muslims and Chinese civilians.

Battle of Aksu 
A minor battle on May 31, 1933, in which Chinese Muslim troops were expelled from the Aksu oases of Xinjiang by Uighurs led by Isma'il Beg when they rose up in revolt.

Battle of Sekes Tash

A minor battle in which Chinese Muslim troops under Gen. Ma Zhancang attacked and defeated Uighur and Kirghiz armies at Sekes Tesh. About 200 Uighur and Kirghiz were killed.

Battle of Kashgar

Uighur and Kirghiz forces, led by the Bughra brothers and Tawfiq Bay, attempted to take the New City of Kashgar from Chinese Muslim troops under Gen. Ma Zhancang. They were defeated. Tawfiq Bey, a Syrian Arab traveler who held the title Sayyid (descendant of prophet Muhammed) and arrived at Kashgar on August 26, 1933, was shot in the stomach by Chinese Muslim troops in September. Previously Ma Zhancang arranged to have the Uighur leader Timur Beg killed and beheaded on August 9, 1933, displaying his head outside of Id Kah Mosque.

Han Chinese troops commanded by Brig. Yang were absorbed into Ma Zhancang's army. A number of Han Chinese officers were spotted wearing the green uniforms of Ma Zhancang's unit of the new 36th Division; presumably they had converted to Islam.

During the battle the Kirghiz prevented the Uighur from looting the city, mainly because they wanted to loot it themselves. They stole the belongings of, and started murdering, the Chinese's concubines and spouses, who were women of Turkic origin and Han and Hui Chinese people themselves.

First Battle of Urumqi (1933)

Chinese Muslim and Uyghur forces under Ma Shih-ming and Khoja Niyas attempted to take Urumqi from a force of provincial White Russian troops under Col. Pappengut and the Northeast Salvation Army under Sheng Shicai. They were driven back after fierce fighting. During the battle, Han Chinese Gen. Zhang Peiyuan, of Ili, refused to help Jin Shuren repulse the attack, a sign that relations between the two were becoming strained.

Battle of Toksun

The Battle of Toksun occurred in July 1933 after Khoja Niyas Hajji, a Uighur leader, defected with his forces to Gov. Sheng Shicai. He was appointed by Shicai through agreement to be in charge for the whole Southern Xinjiang (Tarim Basin) and also Turpan Basin; satisfied with this agreement, he marched away from Urumchi south across Dawan Ch'eng of Tengritagh Mountains and occupied Toksun in Turpan Basin, but was badly defeated by the Chinese Muslim forces of Gen. Ma Shih-ming, who forced him to retreat to Karashar in eastern Kashgaria, where he had his headquarters during July, August and September 1933, defending mountain passes and roads that led from Turpan Basin to Kashgaria in a fruitless attempt to stop the advancement of Tungan armies to the south.

Second Battle of Urumqi (1933–34)

Ma Zhongying conducted secret negotiations with Han Chinese Gen. Zhang Peiyuan for a joint attack against Sheng Shicai's provincial Manchurian and White Russian troops in Urumqi. They joined their armies together and began the attack. Zhang seized the road between Tacheng and the capital. The Kuomintang secretly encouraged Zhang and Ma through Huang Mu-sung to attack Sheng's forces, because of his Soviet connections and to regain the province. Their forces almost defeated Sheng, but then Sheng cabled the Soviet Union for help, which led to the Soviet Invasion of Xinjiang.

Battle of Kashgar

New 36th Division Gen. Ma Fuyuan led a Chinese Muslim army to storm Kashgar on February 6, 1934, and attacked the Uighur and Kirghiz rebels of the First East Turkestan Republic. He freed another New 36th Division general, Ma Zhancang, who had been trapped with his Chinese Muslim and Han Chinese troops in Kashgar New City by the Uighurs and Kirghizs since May 22, 1933. In January 1934 Ma Zhancang's Chinese Muslim troops repulsed six Uighur attacks launched by Khoja Niyaz, who arrived at the city on January 13, 1934; the failed attacks resulted in massive casualties to the Uighur forces. From 2,000 to 8,000 Uighur civilians in Kashgar Old City were massacred by Tungans in February 1934, in revenge for the Kizil massacre, after the retreat of Uighur forces from the city to Yengi Hisar. The Chinese Muslim and New 36th Division Chief Gen. Ma Zhongying, who arrived at Kashgar on April 7, 1934, gave a speech at Idgah mosque in April, reminding the Uighurs to be loyal to the Republic of China government at Nanjing. Several British citizens at the British consulate were murdered by troops from the New 36th Division. Ma Zhongying effectively destroyed the First East Turkestan Republic (TIRET).

Battle of Yangi Hissar

Ma Zhancang led the New 36th Division to attack Uyghur forces at Yangi Hissar, wiping out the entire force and killing their leader, Emir Nur Ahmad Jan Bughra. The siege of Yangi Hissar citadel continued for about a week, during which 500 Uyghur defenders, armed only with rifles, inflicted several hundred casualties on Tungan forces more heavily armed with cannons and machine guns. Quickly depleted of ammunition, Uyghur defenders employed tree trunks, large stones and oil fire bombs to defend the citadel. On April 16, 1934, Tungans managed to breach the walls of the citadel by successful sapping and put all the surviving defenders to the sword. It was reported by Ahmad Kamal in his book "Land Without Laughter" on page 130–131, that Nur Ahmad Jan's head was cut off by Chinese Muslim troops and sent to the local parade ground to be used as a ball in soccer (football) games.

Battle of Yarkand

Ma Zhancang and Ma Fuyuan's Chinese Muslim troops defeated Uighur and Afghan volunteers sent by Afghan King Mohammed Zahir Shah and exterminated them all. The emir Abdullah Bughra was killed and beheaded, his head put on display at Idgah mosque.

Charkhlik Revolt

The New 36th Division under Gen. Ma Hushan crushed a revolt by Uighurs in the Charkliq oasis in 1935. More than 100 Uighurs were executed, and the family of the Uighur leader was taken as hostage.

Misinformation
Some misinformation had been spread by contemporaneous accounts of the Kumul Rebellion. Swiss writer Ella K. Maillart reported, inaccurately, that the Kizil massacre was an attack of Chinese Muslims and Uyghurs on a group of Kirghiz and Han Chinese. More recent sources prove that it was an attack of Kirghiz and Uyghurs on a group of Han Chinese and Chinese Muslims. She also falsely reported that during the battle of Kashgar the Chinese Muslim and Turkic (Uyghur) troops first took the city from the Han Chinese and Kirghiz and then fought among themselves. In reality, the Kirghiz defected from Ma Shaowu and formed their own army, and the Chinese Muslim force under Ma Zhancang joined Ma Shaowu.

See also
 Amur Military Flotilla
 Manchouli Incident
 Sino-Soviet conflict (1929)
 Soviet Invasion of Xinjiang
 Islamic rebellion in Xinjiang (1937)
 Ili Rebellion

References

Wars involving the Republic of China
Wars involving the Soviet Union
Xinjiang Wars
Conflicts in 1931
Conflicts in 1932
Conflicts in 1933
Conflicts in 1934
1930 in China
1931 in China
1932 in China
1933 in China
1934 in China
China–Soviet Union relations
Military history of the Republic of China (1912–1949)